Mert Göksu (born in 1972) is a Turkish businessman and investor. He is the CEO of Sen Properties and the Vice Chairman of Bosphorusgaz.

Early life and education 
Göksu was born in 1972 in Ankara, Turkey. His father was a high-ranking officer in the Turkish Army. As a child, he lived in Ankara and Erzurum before his family settled in Istanbul.   

He graduated from Kadikoy Anatolian High School in 1990. His interest in physics, technical drawing, electromagnetism, and metallurgy shaped his academic career. He received a BSc in Electrical and Electronics from Eastern Mediterranean University. He also holds an MBA degree from Yeditepe University.

Career 
Göksu began his career as an engineer at the Bilgi Elektronik company in Istanbul. He oversaw stakeholder management, corporate strategy development, and correspondence with business partners in Israel and the UK.

In 1997 Göksu became the first hardware Microsoft Certified Product Support Specialist at Probil (now known as Netas Bilisim A.S.), the first-ever Turkish IT company to receive foreign investment. Over time, he moved to the business side, where he stayed for five years.

Göksu founded Imperum, Turkey’s first electrical energy management company, in 2002. He partnered with Siemens Power Generation to provide energy production and consumption data collection systems. In 2003 he sold Imperum to Coretech IT Solutions.

In 2004, he founded Corenergy, the energy business arm of Coretech Group (mow known as Logo Yazilim). Göksu created Turkey’s first electricity market AMR (Automated Meter Reading) system. Under his management, Corenergy offered remote meter reading and energy management to the energy sector.

Göksu partnered up with Adnan Sen to establish Birenerji Electricity Import and Trade Company in 2006.

In 2012, Göksu became the Vice Chairman of Bosphorusgaz, where he coordinated and managed strategic and operational duties with Gazprom. At the helm of Bosphorusgaz, he oversaw making Turkey’s first-ever spot gas import, the first gas import contract with Kazakhstan, the first renewal of an expired import agreement, and the first share takeover of a foreign partner by a Turkish company.

In 2022, Göksu became the CEO of Sen Properties, a development firm in Los Angeles.

Personal life 
Göksu resides in Los Angeles, California. He and his wife have three children.

References

External links 

1972 births
Living people